Lee Jeong-eun or Lee Jung-eun is the name of the following people:

A series of South Korean golfers, all of them have been numbered in order of age:
Lee Jeoung Eun (golfer, born 1976), also known as 'Jeongeun Lee1'
Lee Jeong Eun (golfer, born 1977), also known as 'Jeongeun Lee2'
Lee Jeong Eun (golfer, born 1985), also known as 'Jeongeun Lee3'
Lee Jeong Eun (golfer, born 1987), also known as 'Jeongeun Lee4'
Lee Jeong-eun (golfer, born 1988), also known as 'Jeongeun Lee5'
Lee Jeong-eun (golfer, born 1996), also known as 'Jeongeun Lee6'
Lee Jeong-eun (racewalker) (born 1994), South Korean racewalker
Lee Jung-eun (actress) (born 1970), South Korean actress
Lee Jung-eun (judoka) (born 1988), South Korean judoka
Lee Jung-eun (sport shooter) (born 1987), South Korean sport shooter
See also
Jeong Eun-jee (born 1988), South Korean long track speed skater

References